Stade Parsemain is a Multi-purpose stadium in Fos-sur-Mer, France. It is currently used mostly for football matches and is the home stadium of FC Istres. The stadium is able to hold 12,500 people and was built in 2005.

References

Parsemain
Stade Parsemain
Sports venues in Bouches-du-Rhône
Sports venues completed in 2005
21st-century architecture in France